Ruschein is a former municipality in the district of Surselva in the canton of Graubünden in  Switzerland. Its official language is the Sursilvan dialect of Romansh.  On 1 January 2014 the former municipalities of Ruschein, Castrisch, Ilanz, Ladir, Luven, Pitasch, Riein, Schnaus, Sevgein, Duvin, Pigniu, Rueun and Siat merged into the new municipality of Ilanz/Glion.

History
Ruschein is first mentioned in 765 as Rucene.

Geography

Of this area, 43.1% is used for agricultural purposes, while 25.8% is forested. Of the rest of the land, 3% is settled (buildings or roads) and the remainder (28.2%) is non-productive (rivers, glaciers or mountains).

The former municipality is located in the Ilanz sub-district of the Surselva district.  It is located on a terrace on the northern Vorderrhein valley wall.  It consists of the village of Ruschein and the alpine herding settlement of Alp da Ruschein in the furthest Val da Siat.

Demographics
Ruschein had a population (as of 2011) of 345.  , 4.9% of the population was made up of foreign nationals.  Over the last 10 years the population has decreased at a rate of -4.2%.  Most of the population speaks Romansh(69.4%), with German  being second most common (26.7%) and Albanian being third ( 1.4%).

, the gender distribution of the population was 44.1% male and 55.9% female.  The age distribution, in Ruschein is; 42 children or 11.8% of the population are between 0 and 9 years old and 48 teenagers or 13.5% are between 10 and 19.  Of the adult population, 25 people or 7.0% of the population are between 20 and 29 years old.  62 people or 17.4% are between 30 and 39, 49 people or 13.8% are between 40 and 49, and 33 people or 9.3% are between 50 and 59.  The senior population distribution is 41 people or 11.5% of the population are between 60 and 69 years old, 30 people or 8.4% are between 70 and 79, there are 26 people or 7.3% who are between 80 and 89.

In the 2007 federal election the most popular party was the CVP which received 43.6% of the vote.  The next three most popular parties were the SVP (29.2%), the FDP (17.5%) and the SP (9.5%).

In Ruschein about 70.4% of the population (between age 25-64) have completed either non-mandatory upper secondary education or additional higher education (either university or a Fachhochschule).

Ruschein has an unemployment rate of 1.62%.  , there were 29 people employed in the primary economic sector and about 14 businesses involved in this sector.  11 people are employed in the secondary sector and there are 4 businesses in this sector.  24 people are employed in the tertiary sector, with 10 businesses in this sector.

The historical population is given in the following table:

References

External links

 Official website 
 

Ilanz/Glion
Former municipalities of Graubünden